Wesley Guimarães (born October 7, 1995) is a Brazilian actor. He is known for playing Isac on the Netflix series Invisible City.

Career 
Born in Salvador, Brazil, Wesley found art in 2006 with the volunteer work carried out by Mônica Sansil, and in 2007 he started performing with the "TOPA group" in local parishes, where he first went up on a theater stage. In 2008, Wesley, who increasingly understood himself as an actor, had the opportunity to travel for the sake of art and monetize the activity that contemplated him and record his first feature called Trampolim do Forte, directed by João Rodrigo. In 2012, he returned to the cinemas with João and Vandinha, a film by Aurélio Grimaldi. In 2018, Tungsten was the actor's third film.

In 2019, he played the character Marcel, on the Brazilian Netflix series Brotherhood. In 2021, he played the character Isac in another Netflix series, Invisible City.

Filmography

Television

Film

References 

1995 births
Brazilian actors
Living people
People from Salvador, Bahia